Derrick Nix (born December 11, 1990) is an American professional basketball player for the Windy City Bulls of the NBA G League. He played college basketball for Michigan State.

High school career
Nix attended Pershing High School where he averaged 15 points and 15 rebounds as a senior, leading Pershing to the Class A State title and earning a Detroit Free Press Class A All-State selection, and All-Metro and All-Detroit honors.

College career
Nix played college basketball for Michigan State University. In his freshman year, he made the 2010 NCAA Final Four. Nix had his best season with the Spartans in his senior year when he averaged 9.9 points, 6.6 rebounds and 1.6 assists as Michigan State made NCAA Sweet 16.

Professional career
After completing four seasons at MSU, Nix went undrafted in the 2013 NBA Draft. In July 2013, he signed a three-year deal Slovenian club KK Krka, but left the team in preseason. In October 2013, Nix joined Latvian powerhouse VEF Rīga. He left the club in April 2014 for personal reasons.

On July 22, 2014, he signed a one-year deal with Orléans Loiret Basket of France. On February 3, 2015, he parted ways with Orléans.

On October 15, 2015, Nix signed with Czarni Słupsk of the Polish Basketball League. On November 12, he parted ways with Słupsk after appearing in five games. On December 21, he was acquired by the Grand Rapids Drive of the NBA Development League. Two days later, he made his debut for Grand Rapids in a 113–111 victory over the Canton Charge. On February 16, 2016, he was waived by Grand Rapids. Four days later, he signed with Latvian club BK Ventspils for the rest of the season.

Personal life
The son of Darlis Nix, and Derrick has four siblings on his mother side  Domonique Nix , Eric Nix , and Rashar Nix. He has a son that's 5 years old he goes by Derrick Junior and a 4 year old named Baylie Nix. He has 4 nieces Raye-Marie King, Nia Vines , and Sydney Nix , Dayshanay Vines. Derrick has 4 nephews Devan Vines, Eric Junior, and Tristan jaohn , and Major Nix, and Gary Nix.

References

External links
Michigan State bio
NBADraft.net profile
DraftExpress.com profile
Eurocup profile
FIBA.com profile

1990 births
Living people
African-American basketball players
American expatriate basketball people in France
American expatriate basketball people in Latvia
American expatriate basketball people in Poland
Basketball players from Detroit
BK VEF Rīga players
BK Ventspils players
Grand Rapids Drive players
Michigan State Spartans men's basketball players
Orléans Loiret Basket players
American men's basketball players
Centers (basketball)
21st-century African-American sportspeople